Mongolian Liberal Union Party is a party which aims to separate Inner Mongolia (Southern Mongolia) from China.

The party was started in 2006 in Osaka Prefecture, Japan. The current leader is Olhunud Daichin. In May 2012, the MLUP's website was downed for several days as what was believed to be a cyberattack; those responsible have not been caught.

See also
Southern Mongolian independence movement
Inner Mongolian People's Party
Southern Mongolian Democratic Alliance

References

External links

Inner Mongolian independence movement
Political parties in Japan
Secessionist organizations
Japan–Mongolia relations